was a Japanese variety show aired every weekday on Fuji TV. The show was hosted by Tamori (Kazuyoshi Morita) and ran from 1982 to 2014. The show was produced in the Studio Alta building in Shinjuku, Tokyo. The show featured a series of regular members who only appeared on a particular day of the week. These regular members were changed periodically.

In October 2011, Johnny's Jr. members Yuki Nozawa and Yuma Sanada, known together as the "Noon Boyz", joined as the show's 16th "Iitomo Seinentai" team of assistants and dancers.

The final broadcast of the program took place on March 31, 2014 after thirty-two years on the air. Guests appearing on the program's daily "Telephone Shocking" interview segment during the final week included Tetsuko Kuroyanagi, Beat Takeshi, and Prime Minister Shinzō Abe.

The show had 8,054 episodes, making it the highest episode count in Japan.

Cast
As well as the long-running presenter (Tamori) and "Noon Boyz", the show featured certain regular members depending on the day of the week. As of August 13, 2013, these regulars were as shown below.

Guinness World Record

Three people from this show have received a Guinness World Record. On April 5, 2002, Tamori attended Waratte Iitomo's 5000th show, giving him the record for the longest continued hosting of a live television program. His record was recorded in the 2003 Guinness Book of World Records. On December 26, 2007, it was revealed that SMAP members, Shingo Katori beat the previous record (9 s 50 ms) of consuming 500 ml of milkshake in 9 s 8 ms. However, on the show on that day, Toshi from the owarai duo Taka and Toshi beat his time by 0.02 ms.
On March 31, 2014, Waratte Iitomo aired its final episode and Tamori renewed his world record for most live variety TV shows hosted by the same presenter at 8054 episodes.

References

External links 

  

1982 Japanese television series debuts
2014 Japanese television series endings
1980s Japanese television series
1990s Japanese television series
2000s Japanese television series
2010s Japanese television series
Fuji TV original programming
Japanese variety television shows